Hermitage-Sandyville is a small town on the south coast of Newfoundland, Canada, with a population of 404 people in the 2021 Census. The main source of income for the community is provided by the aquaculture industry, the local salmon plant and fishing.

The school in Hermitage is John Watkins Academy, where students of both Hermitage-Sandyville and Seal Cove attend. The school mascot is the JWA Rebels. Students in this school (currently 37 students) range from Kindergarten to Grade 12.

Hermitage is the location of the ferry port for servicing the isolated outports of Gaultois and McCallum.

Name
Channel Island settlers noted the resemblance of an offshore island to Hermitage Rock, a tidal island off the coast of Saint Helier, Jersey. This rock was the supposed location of Saint Helier's hermitage. Both the town and the bay are named after that rock.

Demographics 

Past Mayors
 Douglas Rose 1997-2013
 Guy Herritt 1994-1997
 Abraham Jensen 1990-1994
 George Fiander 1989-1990
 Wilfred O Roberts 1988-1989
 Calvin Crewe 1983-1988
 Augustus Jones 1976-1982
 Everett Rose 1962-1975

References

Towns in Newfoundland and Labrador